Darreh Bid (also Romanized as Darreh Bīd and Darreh-ye Bīd; also known as Seyyed Yūnesī) is a village in Gazin Rural District, Raghiveh District, Haftgel County, Khuzestan Province, Iran. At the 2006 census, its population was 208, in 41 families.

References 

Populated places in Haftkel County